Tim Samuel Strothers (August 1879 - August 26, 1942) was an American baseball catcher and first baseman in the pre-Negro leagues.

For several years, he played for the Chicago Leland Giants and the Chicago Giants.

Strothers died in Chicago on August 26, 1942, at the age of 63. He is buried at Mount Glenwood Cemetery in Glenwood, Illinois.

References

External links

1879 births
1942 deaths
Baseball catchers
Baseball first basemen
Leland Giants players
People from Clay Center, Kansas
20th-century African-American people